Lamentation (The Mourning of Christ) is  a fresco painted c.1305 by the Italian artist Giotto as part of his cycle of the Life of Christ on the north interior wall of the Scrovegni Chapel   in Padua, Italy. 

The Scrovegni Chapel was built as a private chapel  next to the Eremitani Monastery by the well-to-do  Scrovegni family and consecrated in 1305.  Between 1304 and 1306, Giotto decorated the inside walls and ceiling of the chapel with a series of frescoes depicting scenes from the Bible,   including the Life of Christ series. The works are considered a masterpiece. 
Both the monastery and the chapel now form part of the Musei Civici di Padova. 

Giotto is described as a Proto-Renaissance artist, preceding  and paving the way for the early Florentine Renaissance painters,  breaking the artistic mold of the Byzantine period by introducing naturalism and depth into his work.

In the painting, Christ's body has been lowered from the cross and laid on the ground surrounded by his grieving family and friends. His head is being held by the Virgin Mary and his feet by Mary Magdelene. Behind them,  John the Apostle throws his arms wide in despair. To the right, Nicodemus and Joseph of Arimathea wait to prepare the body to be laid to rest.

See also
 100 Great Paintings, 1980 BBC series
 Lamentation of Christ

Sources

Paintings by Giotto
1300s paintings
Paintings of the Lamentation of Christ
Angels in art